Hawaii 24/7 is a news site primarily focused on the Hawaii Island in the State of Hawaii. It is a part of Hawaii 24/7 Inc.

History

Hawaii 24/7 was founded in November 2008.

In June 2011, Editor Karin Stanton won awards in the online feature writing category of the Society of Professional Journalists Hawaii Chapter 2011 Excellence in Journalism awards. Stanton was awarded first place and also the two other finalist slots.

The stories that received awards:
First Place: “A Pelekane Bay kind of day”
Finalists: “Marine powers through cancer treatment, Ironman 70.3 Hawaii” and “Follow that fish!”

In February 2012, Editor Karin Stanton was named the "Hawaii Sportswriter of the Year" by Alumni Football USA.

In June 2012 Hawaii 24/7 won First Place in the 'Best Website Design' and was a finalist for the 'Best Overall News Site' categories of the Society of Professional Journalists Hawaii Chapter 2012 Excellence in Journalism awards.

In June 2013 Hawaii 24/7 won a 'Finalist' award in the category of 'Online News Reporting' for the story and video “McCormack, Wee add more Lavaman crowns to trophy cabinets" in the Society of Professional Journalists Hawaii Chapter 2013 Excellence in Journalism awards.

References

External links
Official site

Newspapers published in Hawaii
2008 establishments in Hawaii